Frederick Harold Naylor (15 February 1881 – 16 November 1949) was a British swimmer, from Jersey. He competed in the men's 200 metre breaststroke event at the 1908 Summer Olympics.

References

1881 births
1949 deaths
British male swimmers
Olympic swimmers of Great Britain
Swimmers at the 1908 Summer Olympics
Jersey male swimmers
Male breaststroke swimmers